Neshaminy Mall is a  shopping mall located at U.S. Route 1 and Bristol Road in Bensalem Township, Pennsylvania. The mall was opened in 1968 and was the sixth interior mall constructed in Greater Philadelphia. The Neshaminy Mall is anchored by Boscov's and AMC Theatres and has 65 shops and eateries including a food court that was opened in 1989 and retailers including Barnes & Noble and Foot Locker.

The Neshaminy Mall is directly across Bristol Road from Belmont, a historic home. The mall was named after the nearby Neshaminy Creek and features a unique fountain, which features of a waterfall, trees, plants and a statue of Tawanka who was a leader of the Lenni Lenape Native American tribe. The world "Neshaminy" comes from the Lenni Lenape tribe's language. In the 2010s, the mall saw an increased vacancy rate.

Location
The Neshaminy Mall is located in Bensalem Township in Bucks County, Pennsylvania. The mall is located off of the Pennsylvania Turnpike and U.S. Route 1. The Neshaminy Mall is accessible through SEPTA's route  and Boulevard Direct bus routes.

Across the street from the Neshaminy Mall is the Market Place at Neshaminy, which is a  outdoor shopping center that has stores including The Home Depot and Target. Other nearby retailers and eateries include Walmart, Lowe's, Panda Express, Chipotle Mexican Grill, Bertucci's and Starbucks.

History
Plans to build the Neshaminy Mall were made in 1966, with Sears and Strawbridge & Clothier to be anchors. The mall was projected to cost $24 million. The Neshaminy Mall opened in 1968, developed by The Korman Company and Strouse Greenberg. The mall underwent an expansion in 1975 that added a Lit Brothers, along with a new wing of stores. In 1977, the Lit Brothers store at the Neshaminy Mall closed as part of the chain closing all its stores in the Philadelphia area and was replaced by Pomeroy's. The Pomeroy's store became The Bon-Ton in 1987 after the chain was sold. A food court was added to the mall in 1989. In 1990, the Neshaminy Mall was purchased by Homart Development Company from Mutual of New York for over $50 million. The Bon-Ton closed in 1994. In 1995, the mall underwent a renovation that expanded the food court. In addition, Boscov's replaced the former Bon-Ton. The same year, General Growth Properties took over ownership of the mall after it acquired Homart Development Company. A 24-screen movie theater to be built at the mall was approved by Bensalem Township in 1997 after they had initially opposed the project. In 1998, the 24-screen AMC Theatres opened in the mall at a cost of $11 million. The Strawbridge's became Macy's in 2006 after Federated Department Stores acquired May Department Stores in 2005. A former pet store in the Sears court was demolished and replaced with a Barnes & Noble In 2009. In 2015, the mall began a small renovation starting with signage at mall entrances, the main sign and an expansion of the Boscov's.

On January 4, 2017, Macy's announced that its store would be closing in spring 2017 as part of a plan to close 68 stores nationwide. Since the announcement was made, the Macy's closed in early April. As of late 2017, the Neshaminy Mall has seen a slow, but noticeable increase in the vacancy rate, likely to increase more due to the departure of the Macy's. Brookfield Properties bought General Growth Properties in 2018, therefore giving Brookfield ownership of Neshaminy Mall. On October 15, 2018, it was announced the Sears store would be closing as part of a plan to close 142 stores nationwide as a result of the company filing for Chapter 11 bankruptcy. The store closed in January 2019, leaving Boscov's as the only traditional department store at the mall. Plans were made to redevelop the former Sears anchor into a Round One Entertainment space, however, these plans were cancelled due to the COVID-19 pandemic.

In July 2020, it was announced that medical offices would take over the former Sears building. In March 2020, the former Macy's store was sold to SANT properties, who plans to convert the space into mixed use. Also, at the corner of the Macy's parking lot, a Wawa is in the planning stages to be constructed.

References

External links

Brookfield Properties
Shopping malls in Pennsylvania
Shopping malls established in 1968
Buildings and structures in Bucks County, Pennsylvania
Tourist attractions in Bucks County, Pennsylvania
Bensalem Township, Pennsylvania